Mochlus paedocarinatus, also known as Lanza's writhing skink or Abyssinian writhing skink, is a species of skink. It is found in Somalia and Ethiopia.

References

Mochlus
Skinks of Africa
Reptiles of Ethiopia
Reptiles of Somalia
Reptiles described in 1968
Taxa named by Benedetto Lanza
Taxa named by Salvatore Carfi